Julius Vasterling Building, also known as the Seehausen Sanitary Meat Market, is a historic commercial building located at Cape Girardeau, Missouri.  It built about 1868, and is a painted brick, two-part commercial block with three storefronts and residential space on the second level.  It has a stone foundation and a seamless metal, side gabled roof.  An addition was built about 1884 and a section originally built as a dwelling was converted to a storefront in 1925–1927.

It was listed on the National Register of Historic Places in 2009. It is located in the Broadway Commercial Historic District.

References

Individually listed contributing properties to historic districts on the National Register in Missouri
Commercial buildings on the National Register of Historic Places in Missouri
Commercial buildings completed in 1868
Buildings and structures in Cape Girardeau County, Missouri
National Register of Historic Places in Cape Girardeau County, Missouri